Mia Kilburg (née Manganello; born October 27, 1989) is an American speed skater and professional racing cyclist, who currently rides for UCI Women's Continental Team . She is an Olympic bronze medalist in long track speed skating.

Speed skating career
After nearly qualifying for the 2010 Winter Olympics, Kilburg qualified for the 2018 Winter Olympics. Along with teammates Heather Bergsma and Brittany Bowe, Kilburg won bronze in the team pursuit at the 2018 Olympics in Pyeongchang. The medal was U.S. speed skating's first Olympic medal since 2010. Kilburg again qualified for the 2022 Winter Olympics in the mass start event.

Cycling career
Kilburg is also a professional cyclist, riding for the  team. She won the points classification at the 2015 Redlands Bicycle Classic.

See also
List of 2016 UCI Women's Teams and riders

References

External links
 

1989 births
Living people
American female cyclists
Place of birth missing (living people)
American female speed skaters
Speed skaters at the 2018 Winter Olympics
Speed skaters at the 2022 Winter Olympics
Medalists at the 2018 Winter Olympics
Olympic bronze medalists for the United States in speed skating
21st-century American women
World Single Distances Speed Skating Championships medalists